Gayniyamak (Gäynäyamaq) is a rural locality (a selo) and the administrative center of Gayniyamaksky Selsoviet, Alsheyevsky District, Bashkortostan, Russia. The population was 897 as of 2010. There are 14 streets.

Geography 
Gayniyamak is located 52 km southwest of Rayevsky (the district's administrative centre) by road. Alexandrovka is the nearest rural locality.

References

Rural localities in Alsheyevsky District